Mieczysław Sikora (born February 6, 1982 in Wisła) is a Polish football player currently playing for Elana Toruń.

External links
 

1982 births
Living people
Polish footballers
Podbeskidzie Bielsko-Biała players
Odra Wodzisław Śląski players
Piast Gliwice players
Szczakowianka Jaworzno players
TS Koszarawa 1910 Żywiec players
ŁKS Łódź players
Stal Głowno players
KSZO Ostrowiec Świętokrzyski players
Elana Toruń players
People from Wisła
Sportspeople from Silesian Voivodeship
Association football forwards